T-cell surface glycoprotein CD1e, membrane-associated is a protein that in humans is encoded by the CD1E gene.

This gene encodes a member of the CD1 family of transmembrane glycoproteins, which are structurally related to the major histocompatibility complex (MHC) proteins and form heterodimers with beta-2-microglobulin. The CD1 proteins mediate the presentation of primarily lipid and glycolipid antigens of self or microbial origin to T cells. The human genome contains five CD1 family genes organized in a cluster on chromosome 1. The CD1 family members are thought to differ in their cellular localization and specificity for particular lipid ligands. The protein encoded by this gene localizes within Golgi compartments, endosomes, and lysosomes, and is cleaved into a stable soluble form. The soluble form is required for the intracellular processing of some glycolipids into a form that can be presented by other CD1 family members. Several alternatively spliced transcript variants encoding different isoforms have been described. Additional transcript variants have been found; however, their biological validity has not been determined.

See also
 Cluster of differentiation

References

Further reading

External links
 
 
 

Clusters of differentiation